Callum Watson may refer to:

 Callum Watson (skier) (born 1989), Australian cross-country skier
 Callum Watson (musician) (born 1997), Australian pianist, composer and producer
 Callum Watson (footballer) (born 2000), English footballer
 Callum Watson (character), fictional character on the British TV series Footballers' Wives